John Arcudi is an American comic book writer, best known for his work on The Mask and B.P.R.D., and his series  Major Bummer.

Early life
Arcudi grew up in Buffalo, New York. He attended Columbia University as an English major and developed an appreciation for the works of Edgar Rice Burroughs and William Faulkner.

Career
Arcudi worked for Malibu Comics upon its founding in 1986, working on its Eternity line. That same year he started writing for comics, making his first sales to Savage Tales and Savage Sword of Conan for Marvel Comics, and becoming a regular contributor to the humor magazine Cracked.

Arcudi worked on a number of comic books based on films, including RoboCop, Terminator, Predator, Alien, and The Thing. Two of these graphic works were subsequently adapted as full-length novels published by Bantam Books. Arcudi’s series Barb Wire, featuring bounty hunter and bartendress Barbara Kopetski, was adapted into a film of the same name starring Pamela Anderson.

Arcudi also scripted several stories for Dark Horse Presents, such as the series "The Creep", and the police procedural "Homicide". Arcudi's comics crime fiction also includes several scripts for Batman: The Dark Knight and Batman: Black and White.

For Dark Horse Comics, Arcudi worked on developing the second incarnation of the character The Mask first in Mayhem #1–4, and then in a series of books illustrated by Doug Mahnke. Arcudi's work formed the basis of the 1994 feature film starring Jim Carrey. He later also worked on the spin-off television series. Arcudi and later Mahnke teamed up for several projects following The Mask, including the DC Comics series Major Bummer, which focused on a group of ineffectual superheroes.

Arcudi also served as writer on the Wildstorm Productions series Gen13, illustrated by Gary Frank and Cam Smith, and during a run on DC's Doom Patrol, illustrated by Tan Eng Huat.

Arcudi invented the character Captain Daimio for the series B.P.R.D., which he writes with Mike Mignola. Arcudi had contributed a "B.P.R.D." story to the Hellboy comic issued in conjunction with the film as a premium from Wizard Entertainment. Arcudi later wrote a number of separate B.P.R.D. series.

Arcudi contributed the Superman story to Wednesday Comics. He also created a graphic novel called A God Somewhere with Peter Snejbjerg providing the art.

Aside from working in the comic media, Arcudi has also worked briefly in animation. He has written two episodes of The Mask: Animated Series, and one episode of the motion comics based on the comic Batman Black and White.

Bibliography

Comics
 Abe Sapien (with Mike Mignola)
 The Haunted Boy
 The Abyssal Plain #1–2
 The Devil Does Not Jest #1–2
 The New Race of Man #1–2
 "Subconscious" published in Dark Horse Presents (2014) #11
 Aliens: Alchemy #1–3
 Aliens: Genocide #1–4
 Aliens: Stronghold #1–4
 Aquaman #25–29, 32–39
 Batman Black and White vol. 5 #6 (with James Harren)
 Batman: Gotham Nights #4, 7
 Batman: Legends of the Dark Knight #162-63
 B.P.R.D. (with Mike Mignola)
 "Born Again" published in Hellboy: Premiere Edition
 The Dead #1–5
 The Black Flame #1–6
 The Universal Machine #1–5
 Garden of Souls #1–5
 Killing Ground #1–5
 "Revival" published in MySpace Dark Horse Presents #8–9
 War on Frogs #1–4
 The Ectoplasmic Man
 "Out of Reach" published in Free Comic Book Day: Hellboy (2008)
 The Warning #1–5
 The Black Goddess #1–5
 King of Fear #1–5
 Casualties
 1948 #1–5
 B.P.R.D.: Hell on Earth (with Mike Mignola)
 New World #1–5
 Seattle
 Gods #1–3
 Monsters #1–2
 Russia #1–5
 "An Unmarked Grave" published in Dark Horse Presents (2011) #8
 The Long Death #1–3
 The Devil's Engine #1–3
 The Return of the Master #1–5
 A Cold Day in Hell #1–2
 Wasteland #1–3
 Lake of Fire #1–5
 The Reign of the Black Flame #1–5
 The Devil's Wings #1–2
 The Broken Equation #1–2
 Grind
 Flesh and Stone #1–5
 Nowhere, Nothing, Never #1–3
 Modern Prometheus #1–2
 End of Days #1–5
 Cometh the Hour #1–5
 Barb Wire #1–8
 Baseball Greats #1: The Jimmy Piersall Story
 Brass #1–6
 The Creep #0–4
 Dark Horse Comics #1–7, 17–19
 Dark Horse Presents (1986) #23–29, 46, 48–49, 53–58, 60–61, 63–64, 115, 122–23, 146–49
 Dark Horse Presents (2011) #8, 11–13
 Dark Horse Presents (2014) #11, 19–21, 26
 Dark Horse Presents Annual 1997
 Dark Horse Presents: Aliens #1
 Doom Patrol, vol. 3, #1–22
 Excalibur #104, 105
 Flinch #12
 Gen 13, #25–40
 Gen 13: Carny Folk #1
 The Goon: Noir #2
 Hellboy and the B.P.R.D.: 1952 #1–5
 Hellboy: Weird Tales #4—"Abe Sapien: Star of the B.P.R.D."
 Homicide #1
 Image+ (2017) #2
 Justice League of America: Destiny #1–4
 Justice League of America: Superpower #1
 Lobo/Mask #1–2 (with Alan Grant)
 Lobster Johnson (with Mike Mignola)
 The Burning Hand #1–5
 The Prayer of Neferu
 Caput Mortuum
 Satan Smells a Rat
 A Scent of a Lotus #1–2
 Get the Lobster #1–5
 A Chain Forged in Life
 The Glass Mantis
 The Forgotten Man
 Metal Monsters of Midtown #1–3
 Garden of Bones
 The Pirate's Ghost #1–3
 Mangekyō
 The Machine #1–4
 Major Bummer #1–15
 Martian Manhunter, vol. 2 #5
 Mayhem #1–4
 The Mask #0–4
 The Mask Returns #1–4
 The Mask Strikes Back #1–5
 Motorhead #1
 MySpace Dark Horse Presents #6, 8–9, 12, 26
 Predator: Big Game #1–4
 RoboCop: Prime Suspect #1–4
 RoboCop: Roulette #1–4
 Rumble (2014) #1–15
 Rumble (2017) #1–present
 Savage Sword of Conan #150-52, 158, 165, 182
 Savage Tales, second series, #5, 7–8
 Silver Sable #26
 Sledgehammer 44 (with Mike Mignola)
 Sledgehammer 44 #1–2
 Lightning War #1–3
 Solo #2, 6
 Teenage Mutant Ninja Turtles #38 (cover image only)
 Terminator #1–4
 The Thing from Another World: Climate of Fear #1–4
 Thunderbolts #76–81
 Total Carnage #1–4, 6–10
 Walter: Campaign of Terror #1–4
 Warlock and the Infinity Watch #34–35, 37–40, 42
 What if...? Vol. 2, #50
 Wednesday Comics #1–12 – Superman (writer), with art by Lee Bermejo. (2009)
 Sir Edward Grey, Witchfinder: Lost and Gone Forever #1–5 (with Mike Mignola)

Graphic novels
 A God Somewhere with Peter Snejbjerg, published by WildStorm, June 2010, 200 pages,  /  (New edition)

Collections

Magazines
 Cracked (1987)
 Monsters Attack! (1989)
 The Comics Journal (Winter 2003 Special Edition)

Notes

References

External links

 
 

Year of birth missing (living people)
Living people
American comics writers
Columbia College (New York) alumni
American writers of Italian descent
Writers from Buffalo, New York